Robert Lucas may refer to:

 Rob Lucas (born 1953), Liberal member of the South Australian Legislative Council
 Robert Lucas, 3rd Baron Lucas of Shenfield (c. 1649–1705), English nobleman and army officer
 Robert Lucas Jr. (born 1937), economist
 Robert Lucas (governor) (1781–1853), governor of Ohio, 1832–36, first governor of the Iowa Territory 1838–41
 Robert Lyall Lucas (1927–2009), English mycologist, botanist, and phytopathologist
 Robert S. Lucas (born 1930), U.S. Coast Guard admiral
 Robert Slade Lucas (1867–1942), cricketer
 Robert Lucas (musician) (1962–2008), musician in the band Canned Heat
 Robert Lucas (MP), for Ipswich
 Robert Lucas (writer) (1904–1984), Austrian-born writer
 Robert Lucas (field hockey) (born 1922), French field hockey player
 Robert Lucas (sailor) (born 1932), Indonesian Olympic sailor

See also
 Robert Lucas de Pearsall (1795–1856), English composer